Sovereign of the Seas, a clipper ship built in 1852, was a sailing vessel notable for setting the world record for fastest sailing ship—22 knots.

Notable passages

Built by Donald McKay of East Boston, Massachusetts, Sovereign of the Seas was the first ship to travel more than 400 nautical miles in 24 hours.  On the second leg of her maiden voyage, she made a record passage from Honolulu, Hawaii, to New York City in 82 days.  She then broke the record to Liverpool, England, making the passage in 13 days 13.5 hours. In 1853 she was chartered by James Baines of the Black Ball Line, Liverpool for the Australia trade.

Record
In 1854, Sovereign of the Seas recorded the fastest speed for a sailing ship, logging 22 knots (41 km/h, 25 mph).

See also
 Donald McKay
 List of large sailing vessels
 Transatlantic sailing record

Notes

References

Further reading

External links

 Sovereign of the Seas, Springfield Museum, Currier and Ives lithograph
 Painting of clipper ship Sovereign of the Seas, San Francisco Public Library

Individual sailing vessels
Ships built in Boston
Ships designed by Donald McKay
Age of Sail merchant ships of the United States
Merchant ships of the United States
Victorian-era merchant ships of the United Kingdom
History of immigration to Australia
Merchant ships of Germany
Shipwrecks in the Strait of Malacca
1852 ships
Extreme clippers